Aline (minor planet designation: 266 Aline) is a fairly large main belt asteroid that was discovered by Johann Palisa on 17 May 1887 in Vienna and is thought to have been named after the daughter of astronomer Edmund Weiss.

Photometric observations made in 2012 at the Organ Mesa Observatory in Las Cruces, New Mexico, produced a light curve with a period of 13.018 ± 0.001 hours and a brightness variation of 0.10 ± 0.01 in magnitude.

In 2001, the asteroid was detected by radar from the Arecibo Observatory at a distance of 1.41 AU.

References

External links 
 The Asteroid Orbital Elements Database
 Minor Planet Discovery Circumstances
 Asteroid Lightcurve Data File
 
 

Background asteroids
Aline
Aline
C-type asteroids (Tholen)
Ch-type asteroids (SMASS)
18870517